Cuchillo, a Spanish word for a knife, may refer to:
 Cuchillo (film), a 1978 film with Mexican actor Andrés García
 Cuchillo, New Mexico, an unincorporated community
 Cuchillo-Có, a village in La Pampa Province in Argentina
 El Cuchillo, a village in Tinajo, Las Palmas province of western Lanzarote in the Canary Islands
 a knife as used in Eskrima, an umbrella term for the traditional martial arts of the Philippines
 a character (a Mexican drug cartel enforcer) played by Danny Trejo in the film Predators, see : List of Predator characters

See also 
 Cuchillo Negro, the Spanish name of Baishan (c. 1816–1857), a Chihenne Apache chieftain